Microfinance Institutions Network is an association for the microfinance sector in India. Its member organizations constitute the leading microfinance institutions in the country.

Business model
Microfinance Institutions Network was created to promote the key objectives of microfinance, which is to help economically under served communities achieve greater financial independence and build sustainable livelihoods. The network's primary objective is to work towards the robust development of the microfinance sector, by promoting responsible lending, client protection, good governance and a supportive regulatory environment. It was established in October 2009 as a society under the Andhra Pradesh Societies Registration Act 2001. According to its bylaws, all non-banking finance companies registered with the Reserve Bank of India are eligible for membership of the society. The Reserve Bank of India accorded recognition to the network via its letter dated 16 June 2014. Microfinance Institutions Network works closely with regulators and other key stakeholders and plays an active part in the larger financial inclusions dialogue through the medium of microfinance.

Microfinance Institutions Network is organized into four verticals, namely self-regulation, advocacy and development, communications and marketing, and state initiatives to be able to focus on the priorities of the sector in an optimum manner. While previously policy advocacy was the primary focus and continues to be so, with the evolution of the sector there are various new functions that have become part of the framework. The self-regulatory function was part of the Reserve Banks of India's remit to the network to help supervise compliance at a more granular level on behalf of the regulator. With the sector coming back into its own over the last five years, there was felt a need for greater engagement with external stakeholders and a strong communication strategy was thought to be the way ahead. With the industry growing steadily ground level issues are often key indicators of sectoral good health. With this in view the state initiative team keeps continuously engaging with industry issues at a field level to ensure smooth functioning. Microfinance Institutions Network's internal whistle-blowing mechanism tries not to charge beyond rates suggested by the Reserve Bank of India from its member microfinance institutions. This is to ensure there is no more possibilities of charging high rate of interest rates. The Reserve Bank of India has set a cap on the lending rate of microfinance institutions at 26 per cent per annum and a margin cap of 12 per cent over their cost of funds, whichever is lower.

Currently network member organizations consist of 55 of the leading non-banking financial companies and microfinance institutions whose combined business constitutes over 90% of the Indian microfinance sector excluding SHGs.

Database of borrowers
Validation of lending money beyond the clients (borrower) capability to pay back was previously a challenge to the Reserve Bank of India. The network tries to validate this aspect by finding the existing borrowings of the client through dedicated microfinance credit bureaus, only two microfinance institutions can lend to one borrower and together they cannot provide loans beyond Rs 100,000.

The network has facilitated setting up a database of the borrowers which confirms the necessary validation required. The database consists of over 30 million micro borrowers and about 60 million loan accounts. When a person applies for the loan, the networkI checks for the loan history and verifies the Reserve Bank of India benchmark with the credit reports. The credit reports are 80-90% accurate.

Many network members undertake significant social activities across health, education and skill development on a non-profit basis.

References

External links
Official site
Member List

Microfinance organizations
Financial services companies of India